The 2009 Tashkent Open was a women's tennis tournament played on outdoor hard courts. It was the 11th edition of the Tashkent Open, and was part of the WTA International tournaments of the 2009 WTA Tour. It was held at the Olympic Tennis School in Tashkent, Uzbekistan, from 21 September through 27 September 2009. Shahar Pe'er won the singles title.

WTA entrants

Seeds

 1 Rankings are based on the rankings of September 14, 2009

Other entrants
The following players received wildcards into the singles main draw

  Nigina Abduraimova
  Alexandra Kolesnichenko
  Sabina Sharipova

The following players received entry from the qualifying draw:

  Alexandra Panova
  Lesia Tsurenko
  Ksenia Lykina
  Arina Rodionova

The following players received entry as a Lucky loser

  Yuliana Fedak

Finals

Singles

 Shahar Pe'er defeated  Akgul Amanmuradova 6–3, 6–4
It was Pe'er's 2nd title of the year, in successive weeks, and 5th of her career.

Doubles

 Olga Govortsova /  Tatiana Poutchek defeated  Vitalia Diatchenko /  Ekaterina Dzehalevich 6–2, 6–7(1–7), [10–8]

References

External links
Official website

 
Tashkent Open
2009
Tashkent Open